Paula Gellibrand, Marquise de Casa Maury (1898–1986) was once one of the favourite models of Cecil Beaton, described by her contemporaries as "the most beautiful woman in Europe". Her sister was Nadeja Gellibrand, also known as Nada Ruffer, Vogue editor.

Biography
Paula Gellibrand was born in London in 1898.

Paula Gellibrand married four times:
Ivan Wilkie Brooks
in 1923, Pedro Mones, Marquis de Casa Maury, a racing driver and founder of the Curzon Cinema. Beaton remembers that when she married she was "dressed as a nun with scarlet finger nails". 
from 1932 to 1939, William Edward David Allen.
"Boy" Long, a rancher at Elementaita in Kenya.

Before marrying the Marquis de Casa Maury, she had an affair with Freddie Guest.

The 1934 novel Serena Blandish by Enid Bagnold is based upon her life.

In 1936, together with Allen, she wrote Strange Coast, a novel of romance and adventure set in "the Meskhian Republic" — a fictionalized Georgia of the 1920s, published under the pseudonym "Liam Pawle"

In 1933, Cecil Beaton described Gellibrand as "a good-looking tomboy, with gold hair and mushroom-coloured skin around the eyes". As a model she was known only as "The Gellibrand". She was painted by Augustus John and she "was seen at every ball and appeared in Society pageants in the form of a Grecian goddess, and as the months passed, her beauty became more exotically attenuated [...] when I see her in fancy-dress costume, I cannot believe that I have not designed her myself, she is so exactly like my idea of what a beauty of to-day should be." She became a lifelong friend of Beaton and Mary Liliane Matilda, called Baba, Baroness d'Erlanger (1901–1945) was her fashion stylist and childhood friend. In 1919 Augustus John took the portrait Portrait of Baronne Baba d’Erlanger (1901-1945) and Miss Paula Gellibrand (1898-1964). Another good friend was Alice de Janzé.

In 1942, her sister Nada Ruffer divorced from Iva Patcevitch, the Head of Condé Nast. Beaton said that she was "a very pleasing exaggeration of her [Gellibrand] painted by any Parisian fashion-artist. She is taller, thinner, her nose is more pointed and her eyelashes are longer, her hands more claw-like, her hair more sleek; she is even more exaggeratedly chic."

In 1954, Beaton published The Glass of Fashion documenting the Gellibrand appearance in words and images.

The 1928 portrait of Paula Gellibrand, Marquise de Casa Maury by Beaton sold at Christie's for £1,375 in 2017.

References

1898 births
1986 deaths
English female models
20th-century English writers
20th-century English women writers